Nidhhi Agerwal is an Indian actress who primarily works in Telugu, Tamil and Hindi films. After participating in Miss Diva Universe 2014, Agerwal made her acting debut with the Hindi film Munna Michael (2017), for which she received Zee Cine Award for Best Female Debut.  

Agerwal made her Telugu debut with Savyasachi (2018) and Tamil debut with Eeswaran (2021). For the former, she received SIIMA Award for Best Female Debut - Telugu nominations. She has been part of successful films including iSmart Shankar (2019) and Kalaga Thalaivan (2022).

 Early life 
Agerwal was born in Hyderabad and brought up in Bangalore. Born into a Hindi-speaking Marwari family, she can understand as well as speak Telugu, Tamil and Kannada. Her birth year is reported inconsistently either as 1992 or 1993.

Her schooling was at Debipur Milan Vidyapith. She holds a graduation in Business Management from Christ University, Bangalore. She is well trained in ballet, kathak and belly dance.

 Career 

In 2016, director Sabbir Khan confirmed that Agerwal was signed as the lead in his film Munna Michael, alongside Tiger Shroff. She was chosen from among 300 candidates. Agerwal was also asked to sign a no-dating clause till completion of the film. She made her acting debut with the film, which received mixed to negative reviews from critics.

Agerwal made her Telugu film debut in 2018 alongside Naga Chaitanya, with the film Savyasachi. It did not perform well at the box-office. She had two releases in 2019. Mr. Majnu with Akhil Akkineni was unsuccessful at the box-office whereas iSmart Shankar alongside Ram Pothineni was a commercial success running for more than 100 days at the box office. The same year, Agerwal appeared in two music videos, Unglich Ring Daal De sung by Jyotica Tangri and AAHO! Mittran Di Yes Hai with Badshah.
In 2021, she made her Tamil debut opposite Silambarasan in Eeswaran. The film received mixed reviews and was an average success. Her next film, Bhoomi with Jayam Ravi released the same year. It received negative reviews. She also appeared opposite Sonu Sood in Altaf Raja's recreation of Saath Kya Nibhaoge song. In 2022, she appeared Hero alongside debutant Ashok Galla. The film received mixed reviews from the critics and audiences as well. She also appeared alongside Udhayanidhi Stalin in Magizh Thirumeni's action-thriller film Kalaga Thalaivan, which received positive reviews from critics.

She will next be seen as Panchami in Krish Jagarlamudi's Hari Hara Veera Mallu,'' that is scheduled to release in 2023.

In the media 
Agerwal has featured various times on Hyderabad Times Most Desirable Woman list. She ranked 11th in 2019, and 8th in 2020.

She is an active celebrity endorser for several brands. In 2019, she rejected a fairness cream endorsement. Agerwal has also been part of Kalyan Jewellers multilingual ad.

Filmography

Films

Music videos

Awards and nominations 

Other Honours
 Life membership of International Film And Television Club of Asian Academy of Film & Television
 Yamaha Fascino Miss Diva 2014 - Finalist

See also 

 List of Hindi film actresses

References

External links

1990s births
Actresses in Hindi cinema
Living people
Actresses from Bangalore
21st-century Indian actresses
Indian film actresses
Female models from Bangalore
Indian Hindus
Female models from Hyderabad, India
Actresses in Telugu cinema
Marwari people
Zee Cine Awards winners
Christ University alumni
Actresses from Hyderabad, India
Year of birth missing (living people)